Pembina River may refer to:

Pembina River (Alberta), a river in central Alberta, Canada
Pembina River (Manitoba – North Dakota), a river in southern Manitoba, Canada and northern North Dakota, United States
Pembina River (Ontario), a river in northwestern Ontario, Canada